In geometry, Brocard points are special points within a triangle. They are named after Henri Brocard (1845–1922), a French mathematician.

Definition
In a triangle ABC with sides a, b, and c, where the vertices are labeled A, B and C in counterclockwise order, there is exactly one point P such that the line segments AP, BP, and CP form the same angle, ω, with the respective sides c, a, and b, namely that

 

Point P is called the first Brocard point of the triangle ABC, and the angle ω is called the Brocard angle of the triangle. This angle has the property that

where  are the vertex angles  respectively.

There is also a second Brocard point, Q, in triangle ABC such that line segments AQ, BQ, and CQ form equal angles with sides b, c, and a respectively.  In other words, the equations  apply. Remarkably, this second Brocard point has the same Brocard angle as the first Brocard point.  In other words, angle  is the same as 

The two Brocard points are closely related to one another; In fact, the difference between the first and the second depends on the order in which the angles of triangle ABC are taken. So for example, the first Brocard point of triangle ABC is the same as the second Brocard point of triangle ACB.

The two Brocard points of a triangle ABC are isogonal conjugates of each other.

Construction 
The most elegant construction of the Brocard points goes as follows. In the following example the first Brocard point is presented, but the construction for the second Brocard point is very similar.

As in the diagram above, form a circle through points A and B, tangent to edge BC of the triangle (the center of this circle is at the point where the perpendicular bisector of AB meets the line through point B that is perpendicular to BC). Symmetrically, form a circle through points B and C, tangent to edge AC, and a circle through points A and C, tangent to edge AB. These three circles have a common point, the first Brocard point of triangle ABC.  See also Tangent lines to circles.

The three circles just constructed are also designated as epicycles of triangle ABC. The second Brocard point is constructed in similar fashion.

Trilinears and barycentrics of the first two Brocard points
Thus their barycentric coordinates are respectively  and

The segment between the first two Brocard points

The Brocard points are an example of a bicentric pair of points, but they are not triangle centers because neither Brocard point is invariant under similarity transformations: reflecting a scalene triangle, a special case of a similarity, turns one Brocard point into the other.  However, the unordered pair formed by both points is invariant under similarities. The midpoint of the two Brocard points, called the Brocard midpoint, has trilinear coordinates

and is a triangle center; it is center X(39) in the Encyclopedia of Triangle Centers.  The third Brocard point, given in trilinear coordinates as 

is the Brocard midpoint of the  anticomplementary triangle and is also the isotomic conjugate of the symmedian point. It is center X(76) in the Encyclopedia of Triangle Centers.

The distance between the first two Brocard points P and Q is always less than or equal to half the radius R of the triangle's circumcircle:

The segment between the first two Brocard points is perpendicularly bisected at the Brocard midpoint by the line connecting the triangle's circumcenter and its Lemoine point. Moreover, the circumcenter, the Lemoine point, and the first two Brocard points are concyclic—they all fall on the same circle, of which the segment connecting the circumcenter and the Lemoine point is a diameter.

Distance from circumcenter

The Brocard points P and Q are equidistant from the triangle's circumcenter O:

Similarities and congruences

The pedal triangles of the first and second Brocard points are congruent to each other and similar to the original triangle.

If the lines AP, BP, and CP, each through one of a triangle's vertices and its first Brocard point, intersect the triangle's circumcircle at points L, M, and N, then the triangle LMN is congruent with the original triangle ABC. The same is true if the first Brocard point P is replaced by the second Brocard point Q.

Notes

References

.
.

External links
 Third Brocard Point at MathWorld
 Bicentric Pairs of Points and Related Triangle Centers
 Bicentric Pairs of Points
 Bicentric Points at MathWorld

Points defined for a triangle